Prožura  is a village in Croatia. It is connected by the D120 highway. its geographical coordinates are 42° 43' 43" North, 17° 38' 58" East and its original name (with diacritics) is Prožura.

Gallery 

Populated places in Dubrovnik-Neretva County
Mljet